Running Man Philippines is a 2022 Philippine television reality show broadcast by GMA Network. The series is based on a South Korean television variety series of the same title. It stars Mikael Daez, Glaiza de Castro, Ruru Madrid, Buboy Villar, Kokoy de Santos, Angel Guardian and Lexi Gonzales. It premiered on September 3, 2022 on the network's Sabado Star Power sa Gabi and Sunday Grande line up replacing Jose & Maria's Bonggang Villa and Happy Together's timeslot. It concluded on December 18, 2022.

Cast 

 Glaiza de Castro
 Ruru Madrid
 Mikael Daez
 Buboy Villar
 Kokoy de Santos
 Angel Guardian
 Lexi Gonzales

Production
On February 11, 2020, GMA Network announced the co-production deal with SBS Korea for the reality-comedy game show, Running Man Philippines. Production was postponed due to the COVID-19 pandemic.

Principal photography commenced in July 2022 in South Korea.

Episodes

References

External links
 
 

2022 Philippine television series debuts
2022 Philippine television series endings
GMA Network original programming
Philippine television series based on South Korean television series
Philippine reality television series
Television productions postponed due to the COVID-19 pandemic
Television shows set in South Korea